Rodolfo Ares Taboada (25 June 1954 – 26 January 2023) was a Spanish politician. A member of the Socialist Party of the Basque Country–Basque Country Left, he served in the Basque Parliament from 1994 to 2009 and again from 2012 to 2016.

Ares died in Bilbao on 26 January 2023, at the age of 68.

References

1954 births
2023 deaths
21st-century Spanish politicians
Basque politicians
Members of the 5th Basque Parliament
Members of the 6th Basque Parliament
Members of the 7th Basque Parliament
Members of the 8th Basque Parliament
Members of the 9th Basque Parliament
Members of the 10th Basque Parliament
People from the Province of Ourense